Vetovo can refer to one of the following:

 Vetovo, Bulgaria, a town in Ruse Province
 Vetovo Municipality, a municipality (obshtina) in Ruse Province, Central-North Bulgaria
 Vetovo, Croatia, a village in Požega-Slavonia County